The 1998 Guardian Direct Cup was a men's tennis tournament played on indoor carpet courts in London, Great Britain, that was part of the ATP Championship Series of the 1998 ATP Tour. It was the 21st edition of the tournament and was held 23 February – 1 March.

Seeds
Champion seeds are indicated in bold text while text in italics indicates the round in which those seeds were eliminated.

Draw

Finals

References

Milan Indoor
Doubles
Tennis in London
Tennis tournaments in England